Ian Harrison may refer to:

Ian Harrison (Royal Marines officer), officer in the Royal Marines
Ian Harrison (wrestler) (born 1969), wrestler in the X Wrestling Federation
Ian Harrison (judge), judge on the Supreme Court of New South Wales (2007–present)
Ian Harrison (musician), musician with the early music group Oni Wytars
Ian Harrison (racing driver), D1 Grand Prix racedriver
Ian Harrison (table tennis), English table tennis international
Ian Harrison (sailor), Paralympic Gold Medalist sailor